"Bet You Wanna" is a song by South Korean girl group Blackpink featuring American rapper Cardi B. It was released on October 2, 2020, through YG and Interscope as a part of the group's debut Korean-language studio album The Album, and was scheduled to impact US radios on November 10, 2020, as the album's fourth single, but was never sent or promoted. The track was written by Cardi B, Jonathan Descartes, Melanie Joy Fontana, Ryan Tedder, Steven Franks, Teddy, Tommy Brown and Torae Carr, and produced by Franks, Teddy and Brown.

"Bet You Wanna" received critical acclaim and reached number 4 in Malaysia and Singapore, number 14 in South Korea, and the top 100 in Australia, Canada, Ireland, Japan, Portugal, the United Kingdom, and Wallonia. Although it did not enter the US Billboard Hot 100, it debuted at number one on the Bubbling Under Hot 100 chart.

Background
On September 29, 2020, the song was first teased by Cardi B on her Twitter. Upon release, the rapper revealed that she had previously struggled keeping her lyrics clean, saying "it really hard for me to do a verse with no curse words and PG". She followed the tweet up by posting a snippet of an extended version with explicit lyrics. After being attacked by fans of the group on Twitter, she clarified that the fan base makes "relationships with artists very weird" and that she already got paid for her verse. The collaboration serves as the group's first rap feature in any of their songs. The rapper featured the song title in a tweet to United States President Donald Trump in light of his positive COVID-19 case, writing "'Bet You Wanna' wear a mask now".

Composition
"Bet You Wanna" was written by Cardi B, Jonathan Descartes, Melanie Joy Fontana, Ryan Tedder, Torae Carr, Steven Franks, Teddy and Tommy Brown and produced by the latter three. Lyrically, the song is about promising your significant other a good time until "said person is hooked". It was furthermore described as "an upbeat party cut" with a simple beat enhanced by the group's voices and Cardi's rap flow.

Critical reception
Rap-Up called the song a "club-ready bop", while "Cardi sets it off with a fierce and fiery verse". Starr Bownbank of Yahoo thought the song was "one of the catchier bops of the year". Shaad D'Souza at Paper included the song in his "10 New Songs You Need to Hear Now" list, saying it "makes a lot out of its minimal, percussive production". Ranking it the fourth best track of the album, Billboard Jason Lipshutz opined that "the anthem for the admiring boys is playfully soulful, with Jennie and Rosé showcasing their vocals and Cardi keeping it rated PG".

Commercial performance
The song debuted at number 4 on the New Zealand Hot Singles chart, and also charted in Australia, Ireland, Scotland, South Korea and the UK the week of its debut. By the end of 2020, the song had reached 19,600,000 streams in the US.

Credits and personnel
Credits adapted from Tidal.

 Blackpink – vocals
 Cardi B – featured vocals, songwriting
 Jonathan Descartes – songwriting
 Melanie Fontana – songwriting
 Ryan Tedder – songwriting
 Torae Carr – songwriting
 Steven Franks – production, songwriting
 Teddy – production, songwriting
 Tommy Brown – production, songwriting
 Serban Ghenea – mixing, studio personnel

Usage in media
In 2022, "Bet You Wanna" appeared in the second episode of the HBO Max television series Pretty Little Liars: Original Sin.

Charts

Weekly charts

Monthly charts

See also

List of K-pop songs on the Billboard charts

References

2020 songs
Blackpink songs
Cardi B songs
Song recordings produced by Tommy Brown (record producer)
Songs written by Cardi B
Songs written by Melanie Fontana
Songs written by Ryan Tedder
Songs written by Teddy Park
Songs written by Tommy Brown (record producer)